Edward R. Dougherty is an American mathematician, electrical engineer, Robert M. Kennedy '26 Chair, and Distinguished Professor of Electrical Engineering at Texas A&M University. He is also the Scientific Director of the Center for Bioinformatics and Genomic Systems Engineering. Dougherty is a specialist in  nonlinear image processing, small-sample classification problems, and modeling gene regulatory networks. He is the Fellow of IEEE and SPIE.

Dougherty is the author of 16 books, whose topics range from basic probability books to advanced computational biology and genomic systems engineering. He proposed the Probabilistic Boolean Network (PBN) model for gene regulatory networks. PBNs have been extensively used for intervention and classification in genomic problems. He has also introduced the notion of Bolstered Error Estimation and Coefficient of Determination for Nonlinear Signal Processing.

Honors and awards
2012 Distinguished Professor,  Texas A&M University
 2011 Fellow, Institute of Electrical and Electronics Engineers
 2010 Fellow, Texas Engineering Experiment Station
 2007 Doctor Honoris Causa, Tampere University of Technology, Tampere University of Technology
2004 International Society of Optical Engineering (SPIE) President's Award
2000 Fellow,  International Society of Optical Engineering (SPIE)

Bibliography

References

1945 births
Living people
People from New Jersey
Texas A&M University faculty
Rutgers University alumni
Fairleigh Dickinson University faculty
Fairleigh Dickinson University alumni
Rochester Institute of Technology faculty